The 2017–18 Iowa State Cyclones women's basketball team represented Iowa State University during the 2017–18 NCAA Division I women's basketball season. The Cyclones were coached by Bill Fennelly, who was in his twenty-third season at Iowa State. They played their home games at Hilton Coliseum in Ames, Iowa as members of the Big 12 Conference. They finished the season 14–17, 7–11 in Big 12 play to finish in a tie for seventh place. They advanced to the quarterfinals of the Big 12 women's tournament where they lost to Texas.

Previous season

The Cyclones finished the 2016–17 season 18-13, 9-9 in Big 12 play to finish in fifth place.  They fell to Kansas State in the 2017 Big 12 Conference women's basketball tournament. The team was able to qualify for the NCAA tournament as a No. 9 seed at-large team. They lost to Syracuse in the First Round of the NCAA Tournament

Departures

2018–19 team recruits

Roster

Schedule and results

|-
!colspan=12 style=| Exhibition

|-
!colspan=12 style=| Regular Season

|-
!colspan=12 style=| Big 12 Conference Season

|-
!colspan=12 style=| Big 12 Tournament

Rankings

*AP does not release post-NCAA tournament rankings

Awards and honors

See also
 2017–18 Iowa State Cyclones men's basketball team

References

Iowa State Cyclones women's basketball seasons
Iowa State
Iowa State Cyc
Iowa State Cyc